DashCon (originally titled Tumbl-Con USA) was a fan convention catering primarily to users of the blogging service Tumblr, with a particular emphasis on fandoms. Held over the weekend of July 11, 2014, at the Renaissance Schaumburg Convention Center Hotel in Schaumburg, Illinois, the inaugural convention quickly became infamous for allegations of mismanagement and corruption among organizers, an alleged abrupt demand by the hotel for an upfront payment of cash for use of its facilities, and celebrity guests being forced to drop out of the convention after they were informed by the hotel that they would be responsible for paying for their rooms. A small ball pit placed in one of the halls became a meme after organizers offered attendees an "extra hour" in the pit (along with raffle and concert tickets) as reimbursement for a canceled panel.

Organizers for DashCon initially stated they would hold a second DashCon in 2015 despite the issues faced by the inaugural edition, but officially announced via Tumblr post in September 2014 that DashCon LLP would be dissolved and have all its assets liquidated, meaning they would not hold a second convention. The post also denied claims that a similarly themed convention, Emoti-Con, was a re-branded DashCon.

Concept 
DashCon was originally announced in mid-2013 under the name Tumbl-Con USA, as a convention catered to users of the blogging platform Tumblr, and was touted as the "largest gathering of Tumblr users to date". The convention was to focus on works that had developed significant followings among Tumblr users, such as Doctor Who, Sherlock, Supernatural and the podcast Welcome to Night Vale. The convention raised money through ticket pre-orders, along with a crowdfunding campaign on Indiegogo. Prior to the start of the convention, the name of the event was changed to DashCon (alluding to the site's dashboard feed) to indicate that it was not officially associated with Tumblr.

Convention 

The convention was organized by DashCon LLP, a Hudson, Ohio-based limited liability partnership owned by Megan Eli and Roxanne Schwieterman. DashCon was held from July 11 to 13, 2014, at the Renaissance Schaumburg Convention Center Hotel. Among the guests originally scheduled to attend were actor Doug Jones, webcomic artist ND Stevenson, and the cast of Welcome to Night Vale.

On the evening of July 11 – the first night of DashCon – early reports began to surface from attendees that events occurring at the convention were poorly planned and attended, a vendor had left due to poor sales, and minors had been admitted into 18+ rated panels. The convention itself also began to experience unexpected financial difficulties: a DashCon staff member claimed that the staff of the Renaissance purportedly informed them that they would need to pay $20,000 upfront for the use of the facilities, or shut the convention down. DashCon organizers claimed to have verbally negotiated to pay the venue gradually throughout the convention using ticket sales, rather than issuing an upfront payment despite their contract suggesting otherwise.

At 9:00 p.m. CT, as a result of this unexpected development, the DashCon organizers began to publicly solicit donations among a crowd of around 350 attendees (itself much lower than the original estimate of 3,000 to 7,000 attendees), and online via PayPal, to cover costs, with a goal of collecting at least $17,000 by 10:00 p.m. to prevent the convention from being shut down. Organizers speculated that the abrupt change in plans was because the hotel's management "[did not] like the people at the con". Attendees were seen performing a three-fingered salute from The Hunger Games, chanting lines from High School Musical, and singing Queen's "We Are the Champions" and "Do You Hear the People Sing?" from Les Misérables. While organizers managed to raise the necessary funds, the incident raised suspicion among attendees over the possibility of the crowdfunding drive being a scam (which included disputes over the authenticity of an image of the bill, printed on hotel stationery, which was released by a staff member), or being further proof of the alleged mismanagement and corruption.

Several guests – including ND Stevenson (who had to moderate his own panel because the scheduled moderator was absent), the Baker Street Babes (who produced an all-female Sherlock Holmes podcast), and the Welcome to Night Vale cast – were also informed by the hotel that they would be responsible for paying for their own rooms, despite previously being told that the rooms would be paid for by the convention itself. Stevenson ultimately joined the WTNV cast for the night in accommodations obtained via Airbnb. The appearance by the Welcome to Night Vale cast was ultimately canceled; organizers did not issue refunds but instead reimbursed those who had purchased tickets for the panel with tickets to a raffle of various autographed collectibles, admission to a concert with the Chicago-based Doctor Who-inspired rock band Time Crash, and an "extra hour with the ball pit".

Reception and aftermath 

The ball pit – roughly the size of a kiddie pool, in an otherwise empty concession hall – and the notion of an "extra hour" in it, quickly became a meme among attendees and other Tumblr users, inspiring parodies. Users envisioned other large quantities of items that could have been purchased with the $17,000, and a video game developer created Dashcon Simulator 2014, a comedic simulation of the convention's ball pit. Convention guest Mark Oshiro explained that the ball pit was "not a point of interest, it wasn't something a single soul talked about, and it was just a quirky thing that existed", and that "in order to support the idea that DashCon was a full, 100 percent disaster, every single detail was used to paint the con and the people at it as horrific failures of humanity".

In the aftermath of the convention, a staff member of the hotel stated that the facility did enjoy their presence, while DashCon's staff promised to provide a more thorough explanation of what had occurred. The Baker Street Babes reported that the hotel payment issue was, according to organizers, a mistake. Stevenson, whose hotel payment had not yet been resolved, defended criticism of DashCon by other users, arguing that they were unfamiliar with what typically occurs at a convention in the first place.

Emoti-Con 
In September 2014, The Daily Dot published an article where they reported on concerns that DashCon had renamed/rebranded itself Emoti-Con (aka Emoti-Con Indy) which was being led by Cain Hopkins, a co-creator of DashCon. Hopkins's company, So Attacked Entertainment LLC, then created a webpage for the con. The writer noted that the two conventions were nearly identical in their themes, that Emoti-Con was to be held in the same venue that the second DashCon was to be hosted at, the Emoti-Con website contained much of the same text as the DashCon website, and that it was being organized by one of the co-creators of DashCon. DashCon later denied that the two cons were the same via a post on their official Tumblr account, where they stated that while Emoti-Con was being organized by two of the three owners of DashCon, the two events are otherwise unrelated to one another. They also stated that Emoti-Con would be "functioning under a very different infrastructure than DashCon did, with a more experienced and well-rounded staff". Emoti-Con was later canceled, with their official Tumblr account citing "personal, financial, and safety" issues.

See also 
Fyre Festival
TanaCon

References

External links 

2013 establishments in Illinois
2014 disestablishments in Illinois
2014 in Illinois
July 2014 events in the United States
Conventions in Illinois
Defunct multigenre conventions
Schaumburg, Illinois
Tumblr